The burpee, a squat thrust with an additional stand between repetitions, is a full body exercise used in strength training. The movement itself is primarily an anaerobic exercise, but when done in succession over a longer period can be utilized as an aerobic exercise.

The basic movement as described by its namesake, physiologist Royal H. Burpee, is performed in four steps from a standing position and known as a "four-count burpee":

 Move into a squat position with your hands on the ground.
 Kick your feet back into an extended plank position, while keeping your arms extended.
 Immediately return your feet into squat position.
 Stand up from the squat position.

You can make this exercise modified by stepping back into a plank instead 

Moves 2 and 3 constitute a squat thrust. Many variants of the basic burpee exist, and they often include a push-up and a jump.

Origin

The exercise was invented in 1939 by US physiologist Royal Huddleston Burpee Sr., who used it in the burpee test to assess fitness. Burpee earned a PhD in applied physiology from Teachers College, Columbia University in 1940 and created the "burpee" exercise as part of his PhD thesis as a quick and simple fitness test, which may be used as a measure of agility and coordination. The original burpee was a "four-count burpee" consisting of movements through four different positions, and in the fitness test, the burpee was performed four times, with five heart rate measurements taken before and after the four successive burpees to measure the efficiency of the heart at pumping blood and how quickly the heart rate returns to normal.  

The exercise was popularized when the United States Armed Services made it one of the ways used to assess the fitness level of recruits when the US entered World War II. Although the original test was not designed to be performed at high volume, the Army used the burpee to test how many times it can be performed by a soldier in 20 seconds – eight burpees in 20 seconds is considered poor, 10 is fair, 13 or more excellent. The Army also considered that a soldier fit enough for the rigor of war should be able to perform 40 or 50 burpees non-stop in an easy rhythm.

Variants 

 Box-jump burpee  The athlete jumps onto a box, rather than straight up and down.
 Burpee broad jump A burpee followed by a stationary two footed distance jump.

 Burpee push-up The athlete performs one push-up after assuming the extended plank position.
 Dumbbell burpee The athlete holds a pair of dumbbells while performing the exercise.
 Devil-press burpee The athlete performs a non-jumping burpee with dumbbells and then overhead presses the dumbbells.

 Eight-count push-up or double burpee The athlete performs two push-ups after assuming the plank position. This cancels the drive from landing after the jump and makes the next jump harder. Each part of the burpee might be repeated to make it even harder.
 Hindu push-up burpee Instead of a regular push-up, do a Hindu push-up.
 Jump-over burpee The athlete jumps over an obstacle between burpees.
 Knee push-up burpee  The athlete bends their knees and rests them on the ground before performing the push-up.
 Long-jump burpee  The athlete jumps forward, not upward.
 Muscle-up burpee  Combine a muscle-up (a variation of a pull-up) with the jump or do a muscle-up instead of the jump.
 One-armed burpee  The athlete uses only one arm for the whole exercise including the push-up.
 One-leg burpee  The athlete stands on one leg, bends at the waist and puts hands on ground so they are aligned with shoulders. Next jump back with the standing leg to plank position. Jump forward with the one leg that was extended, and do a one-leg jump. Repeat on opposite side.
 Pull-up burpee  Combine a pull-up with the jump or do a pull-up instead of the jump.

 Side burpee The athlete bends at waist and places hand shoulder-width apart to the side of right or left foot. Jump both legs out to side and land on the outer and inner sides of your feet. Jump back in, jump up, and repeat on opposite side.

 Burpee mountain climber The athlete does a full regular burpee, when the chest and thigh are on the ground, the athlete completes a full mountain climber (split-squat thrust)
 Tuck-jump burpeeThe athlete pulls their knees to their chest (tucks) at the peak of the jump.

World records

Chest-to-ground burpees

One minute 
On August 1, 2022, in the Chinese Special Administrative Region of Macao, Ieong Man Teng achieved a record 33 chest-to-ground burpees in one minute.

One hour 
On June 25, 2021, in Singapore, Cassiano Rodrigues Laureano achieved a record 951 chest-to-ground burpees in one hour.

12 hours 
On July 7, 2019, in Milford, Michigan, Army ROTC Cadet Bryan Abell set the Guinness World Record for most chest-to-ground burpees performed in 12 hours by completing 4,689 burpees.
On December 1, 2019, this record was broken and the new record was set as 5,234 by Samuel Finn from Canada.

72 hours 
At 6 am on October 21, 2013, in Portland, Oregon, Lloyd Weema broke the burpee world record: the most chest-to-ground burpees performed in 72 hours with 9,480.

See also 
 Sun Salutation - a sequence of yoga postures that bears some similarities.

References

External links

 "Can we make our soldiers tough enough?" in Popular Science, February 1944

Aerobic exercise
Articles containing video clips
Bodyweight exercises
Physical exercise
Strength training